The 2010–11 Luge World Cup was a multi race tournament over a season for luge. The season started on 27 November 2010 in Igls, Austria and ended on 20 February 2011 in Sigulda, Latvia. The World Cup was organised by the FIL and sponsored by Viessmann.

Calendar 
Below is the schedule for the 2010/11 season.

Results

Men's singles

Doubles

Women's singles

Team relay

Standings

Men's singles

Doubles

Women's singles

Team relay

See also
FIL World Luge Championships 2011

References

Luge World Cup
2010 in luge
2011 in luge